Clara Southern (3 October 1860 – 15 December 1940) was an Australian artist associated with the Heidelberg School, also known as Australian Impressionism. She was active between the years 1883 and her death in 1940. Physically, Southern was tall with reddish fair hair, and was nicknamed 'Panther' because of her lithe beauty.

Biography 

Southern was born in Kyneton, Victoria, in 1860, the eldest of six children. She was the daughter of local timber merchant and farmer John Southern and Jane Elliott. Southern studied at the School of Design, National Gallery of Victoria under Oswald Rose Campbell and at the National Gallery of Victoria Art School under George Folingsby and Frederick McCubbin. When in Melbourne she shared a studio at Grosvenor Chambers, 9 Collins Street, with Jane Sutherland and Tom Roberts from 1888. She taught art classes from her studio, and regularly joined her Heidelberg School colleagues on plein air painting trips to Heidelberg and Eaglemont.

By 1908 she had established an artistic community of younger landscape painters at Warrandyte, a township on the Yarra about 30 kilometres from Melbourne. The community included Penleigh Boyd and Harold Herbert. Her teacher and mentor Walter Withers often visited her in Warrandyte to paint the landscape. Her residence at cottage 'Blythe Bank' in Warrandyte was integral to the development of the artistic community there, with regular visits from the McCubbins and Colquhouns, and Jo Sweatman becoming her neighbour at 'Kipsy.' Many of her works capture the spirit of the area, such as 'Evensong' and 'A Cool Corner, and she encouraged many a young artist to visit her studio there. At one point she was regarded as the eminent female landscape artist in Melbourne.

On 9 November 1905, Southern married local miner John Arthur Flinn at St. John's Anglican Church in Blackburn. Together they built a cottage, and later a studio, at Blythe Bank, Warrandyte. Even after her marriage, Southern continued to exhibit under her own name.

An Old Bee Farm, held by the National Gallery of Victoria is one of her better known works. It was one of 56 paintings included in Lloyd O'Neil's Classic Australian Paintings, and was used as the cover illustration for Kay Schaffer's 1988 book Women and the Bush: Forces of Desire in the Australian Cultural Tradition.

Southern was a member of the Victorian Artists Society, the Australian Art Association, the Melbourne Society of Women Painters and Sculptors, the Twenty Melbourne Painters, and the Lyceum Club. Paving the way for women's involvement in the arts, Southern was one of the first women to be elected to the Buonarotti Society, and the first female member of the Australian Artists' Association.

Clara was also supportive of charity and relief efforts, supporting Violet Teague and her sister Una in an exhibition for the Hermannsburg Mission Water Supply in Central Australia. Bushfires were a devastating risk in her township of Warrandyte, and she contributed to the Artists' Bushfire Relief Fund Exhibition. Unfortunately some time after she passed her beloved cottage 'Blythe Bank' was lost to bushfires.Miss Clara Southern (Mrs J. Flinn) is a sweet and original singer of the Australian bush in colour, which, by the most skilful use of her pigments, she realises in all its beauty and charm, its majestic silences, its harmonies, and those mysterious distances we all know and feel when in its midst. We can almost hear the wind sighing and sobbing through her trees and that furtive movement of life beneath the beautiful undergrowth that trembles in her foregrounds. Her landscapes are truly poems, full of sentiment and feeling, and that artistic reticence so seldom met with, which never allows nature to be for one moment oppressed or overstepped, or the note forced under any pretence.

-'A Lyrical Painter', Kyneton Guardian, 14 March 1914 Southern died in Melbourne on 15 December 1940.

Southern Close in the Canberra suburb of Chisholm is named in her honour.

 Selected works 

 Exhibitions 

 1899–1917 - Victorian Artists' Society
 1907 - First Australian Women's Work Exhibition
 1914, 1917–1919 – Australian Art Association Exhibition
 1934 - Exhibition in aid of the Hermannsburg Water Supply in Central AustraliaPosthumously:'''

 1975 - Australian Women Artists, One Hundred Years 1840–1940, Melbourne University, Ewing and George Paton Gallery
 1995 - A l'hombre des jeunes filles et des fleurs: In the shadow of young girls and flowers, Benalla Art Gallery
 2011–2012 - Look, Look Again, Lawrence Wilson Art Gallery, University of Western Australia

 References 

 External links 

 Online Gallery of Southern's works
 
 Women of the Heidelberg School, by Andrew MacKenzie, sponsored by the Victorian Government.
 Clara Southern: Australian art and artists file, State Library Victoria''

1860 births
1940 deaths
Heidelberg School
Australian women painters
19th-century Australian painters
20th-century Australian painters
19th-century Australian women artists
20th-century Australian women artists
People from Kyneton
Artists from Victoria (Australia)
National Gallery of Victoria Art School alumni